Ooi Teik Hock (born 13 November 1920 – 21 March 1983) was a male badminton player from Malaysia who won Malayan national titles and represented his country in team and individual competition between 1939 and 1958.

Career 
Ooi played on four consecutive Malayan Thomas Cup (men's international) teams (1949, 1952, 1955, 1958) the first three of which claimed world titles. Paired with a variety of partners, he was undefeated in eight Thomas Cup doubles matches, while winning four of his six singles matches. He shared the men's doubles title at the prestigious All-England Championships in 1949 with Teoh Seng Khoon and in 1954 with Ong Poh Lim. In the '49 All-England's he was runner-up in men's singles to the legendary Dave Freeman.

Personal life 
Ooi married Choo Soh Cheng and together they had a son, Heng Leng, and two daughters, Sooi Choo and Sooi Gaik.

Death 
On 21 March 1983, Teik Hock died at his Penang home after a heart attack. He was 62.

Achievements

International tournaments 
Men's singles

Men's doubles

References 

1920 births
1983 deaths
Malaysian sportspeople of Chinese descent
Malaysian male badminton players
20th-century Malaysian people